Alinda is a subgenus (of Balea) or genus of small air-breathing land snails, terrestrial pulmonate gastropod mollusks in the family Clausiliidae, the door snails. The name Alinda Adams & Adams, 1855 cannot be used because the older name Plicaphora Hartmann, 1841 has as type * A junior synonym of Alinda's type species Turbo biplicatus Montagu, 1803.

Species
Species in this genus include:
 Alinda atanasovi (Urbański, 1964)
 Alinda biplicata (Montagu, 1803)
 Alinda elegantissima A. J. Wagner, 1914
 Alinda fallax (Rossmässler, 1836)
 Alinda jugularis (Vest, 1859)
 Alinda nordsiecki (Dedov & Neubert, 2002)
 Alinda pancici (Pavlović, 1912)
 Alinda serbica (Möllendorff, 1873)
 Alinda stabilis (L. Pfeiffer, 1847)
 Alinda viridana (Rossmässler, 1836)
 Alinda vratzatica (I. M. Likharev, 1972)
 Alinda wagneri (A. J. Wagner, 1911)

References

 Bank, R. A. (2017). Classification of the Recent terrestrial Gastropoda of the World. Last update: July 16th, 2017

External links
 Adams H. & Adams A. (1853-1858). The genera of Recent Mollusca; arranged according to their organization. London, van Voorst. Vol. 1: xl + 484 pp.; vol. 2: 661 pp.; vol. 3: 138 pls. [Published in parts: Vol. 1: i-xl (1858), 1-256 (1853), 257-484 (1854). Vol. 2: 1-92 (1854), 93-284 (1855), 285-412 (1856), 413-540 (1857), 541-661 (1858). Vol. 3: pl. 1-32 (1853), 33-96 (1855), 97-112 (1856), 113-128 (1857), 129-138 (1858) 
 Hartmann, J.D.W. (1840-1844). Erd- und Süsswasser-Gasteropoden der Schweiz. Mit Zugabe einiger merkwürdigen exotischen Arten, i-xx, 1-36, pl. 1-2 [30-06-1840; 37-116, pl. 13-36 [1841]; 117-156, pl. 37-60 [1842]; 157-204, pl. 61-72 [1843]; 205-227, pl. 73-84 [1844]. St. Gallen]

Clausiliidae